The 2011 F2000 Championship Series season was the sixth season of competition in the series, an American professional touring open-wheel racing series using the Formula Ford. It consisted of 14 rounds (seven double-race weekends), beginning April 8 at Virginia International Raceway and concluding October 16 at Watkins Glen International.

Twenty-six-year-old Canadian driver Remy Audette, competing for a family-owned team, won five races and finished on the podium four more times on his way to the championship by an over 100 point margin over his closest challenger, American Chris Livengood who won twice. Twenty-year-old American Kyle Connery won six times, but failed to finish four times and failed to start twice, while Audette finished every race seventh or better. The only other driver to win a race was Australian Nathan Morcom who won the season opener at Virginia International Raceway.

American Tim Minor captured his second Master's Class title for drivers 40 and older. Minor finished on the overall podium six times and finished fourth in the overall championship.

The season finale at Watkins Glen International drew a large 35-car field but at the start of the race Tom Fatur crashed hard into the pit wall separator, forcing the race to be postponed one day due to damage to the wall. Despite the hard impact, Fatur was uninjured.

Drivers and teams

Race calendar and results

Championship standings

This list only contains drivers who registered for the championship.
(M) indicates driver is participating in Masters Class for drivers over 40 years of age.

References

External links
 Official Series Website

F2000 Championship Series seasons
F2000